Astragalus asymmetricus is a species of milkvetch known by the common name San Joaquin milkvetch. It is endemic to California, where it grows in grassy and disturbed areas in the Central Valley and nearby parts of the Central Coast Ranges and San Francisco Bay Area.

Description
It is coated in long hairs.

References

External links
Jepson Manual Treatment - Astragalus asymmetricus
USDA Plants Profile
Astragalus asymmetricus - Photo gallery

asymmetricus
Endemic flora of California
Natural history of the Central Valley (California)